The 20th Stinkers Bad Movie Awards were released by the Hastings Bad Cinema Society in 1998 to honor the worst films the film industry had to offer in 1997. This was the first year that the ballots would be open to the public, which is why percentages of votes for each candidate were listed besides most categories. To celebrate the 20th award ballot, the Lifetime Non-Achievement Award was given out to Chevy Chase and a multitude of other categories, including Worst On-Screen Couple and Worst Director, were introduced. Founder Ray Wright listed Batman & Robin and Crash among his five worst movies of the 1990s, which also included It's Pat, Pokémon: The First Movie, and Nothing but Trouble. While Batman & Robin was a preliminary target and took home several awards, Crash  was largely ignored aside from the Founders Award because it was a low-key indie film. The founders also admitted that if they had expanded the Worst Picture ballot to 10 nominees, they would have included B.A.P.S., Excess Baggage, Flubber, Jungle 2 Jungle, and McHale's Navy. 

Listed as follows are the different categories with their respective winners and nominees, including Worst Picture and its dishonorable mentions, which are films that were considered for Worst Picture but ultimately failed to make the final ballot (30 total). All winners are highlighted.

Winners and Nominees

Worst Picture

Dishonourable Mentions 

 Alien Resurrection (Fox)
 An American Werewolf in Paris (Hollywood)
 Anaconda (Columbia)
 B.A.P.S. (New Line)
 Bean (Gramercy)
 Booty Call (Columbia)
 Con Air (Touchstone)
 Double Team (Columbia)
 Excess Baggage (Columbia)
 Face/Off (Paramount)
 Fathers' Day (Warner Bros.)
 Fire Down Below (Warner Bros.)
 Flubber (Disney)
 For Richer or Poorer (Universal)
 Free Willy 3 (Warner Bros.)
 Gone Fishin' (Hollywood)
 Home Alone 3 (Fox)
 I Know What You Did Last Summer (Columbia)
 Jungle 2 Jungle (Disney)
 McHale's Navy (Universal)
 Mr. Magoo (Disney)
 The Pest (TriStar)
 RocketMan (Disney)
 A Smile Like Yours (Paramount)
 Speed 2: Cruise Control (Fox)
 Steel (Warner Bros.)
 'Til There Was You (Paramount)
 Turbulence (MGM)
 U Turn (TriStar)
 Vegas Vacation (Warner Bros.)

Worst Director

Worst Actor

Worst Actress

Worst Supporting Actor

Worst Supporting Actress

Worst Sequel 
{| class="wikitable sortable plainrowheaders" border="1" cellpadding="5" cellspacing="0" align="centre"
! Recipient
! Percentage of Votes
|-
|- style="background:#B0C4DE;"
| ''Speed 2: Cruise Control (Fox)| 31%|-
|Alien Resurrection (Fox)
| 10%
|-
|An American Werewolf in Paris (Hollywood)
| 14%
|-
|Batman & Robin (Warner Bros.)
| 23%
|-
|The Lost World: Jurassic Park (Universal)
| 22%
|-
|}

 Worst Screenplay for a Film Grossing Over $100M Worldwide Using Hollywood Math 
{| class="wikitable sortable plainrowheaders" border="1" cellpadding="5" cellspacing="0" align="centre"
! Recipient
! Percentage of Votes
|-
|- style="background:#B0C4DE;"
| Batman & Robin (Warner Bros.), written by Akiva Goldsman; based on characters created by DC Comics| 27%|-
|Flubber (Disney), written by John Hughes; based on A Situation of Gravity / The Absent-Minded Professor
| 17%
|-
|George of the Jungle (Disney), story by Dana Olsen; screenplay by Olsen and Audrey Wells; based on the TV series George of the Jungle
| 21%
|-
|The Lost World: Jurassic Park (Universal), written by David Koepp; based on Michael Crichton's novel The Lost World
| 12%
|-
|Speed 2: Cruise Control (Fox), story by Jan de Bont and Randall McCormick; screenplay by McCormick and Jeff Nathanson; based on characters created by Graham Yost
| 23%
|-
|}

 Worst Resurrection of a TV Show 
{| class="wikitable sortable plainrowheaders" border="1" cellpadding="5" cellspacing="0" align="centre"
! Recipient
! Percentage of Votes
|-
|- style="background:#B0C4DE;"
| McHale's Navy (Universal)| 43%|-
|Bean (Gramercy)
| 19%
|-
|Mr. Magoo (Disney)
| 38%
|-
|}

 Worst On-Screen Couple 

 The Sequel Nobody Was Clamoring For 
{| class="wikitable sortable plainrowheaders" border="1" cellpadding="5" cellspacing="0" align="centre"
! Recipient
! Percentage of Votes
|-
|- style="background:#B0C4DE;"
| Free Willy 3: The Rescue (Warner Bros.)| 39%|-
|Alien Resurrection (Fox)
| 6%
|-
|Home Alone 3 (Fox)
| 24%
|-
|Texas Chainsaw Massacre: The Next Generation (Sony)
| 21%
|-
|Vegas Vacation (Warner Bros.)
| 10%
|-
|}

 Most Annoying Fake Accent 

 Most Painfully Unfunny Comedy 

 Most Unwelcome Direct-to-Video Release 

 Lifetime Non-Achievement Award - The Hall of Shame 

 The Founders Award - What Were They Thinking and Why? 
 Cats Don't Dance (Warner Bros.) Crash (Fine Line) Jungle 2 Jungle (Disney) Year of the Horse'' (Universal, October)

Films with multiple nominations and wins
The following films received multiple nominations:

The following films received multiple awards:

References 

Stinkers Bad Movie Awards
Stinkers Bad Movie Awards